Early Edition is a Philippine morning news and talk show broadcast by the ABS-CBN News Channel (ANC). The show aired from February 27, 2017, to 
March 17, 2020, replacing Mornings @ ANC. Hosted by Christian Esguerra, Lexi Schulze, Michelle Ong, and Migs Bustos. It airs every Weekdays at 05:30 (PST).

On March 17, 2020, the program is suspended due to the COVID-19 pandemic in the Philippines and eventually was cancelled due to the shutdown of ABS-CBN and was later replaced by Matters of Fact with Christian Esguerra in April 2020.

After 4 years, the show aired its final broadcast Early Edition on March 17, 2020 & Matters of Fact on May 21, 2021 has ended following the denial of its legislative franchise on July 10, and was replaced by a new talk show After the Fact on May 24, 2021 at 8-9 pm after TV Patrol.

Final Anchors 
 Christian Esguerra (now with Matters of Fact & Headstart relief anchor for Davila)
 Lexi Schulze (now with ANC Rundown Weekend Special)
 Michelle Ong (now with Market Edge & Matters of Fact relief anchor for Esguerra)
 Migs Bustos (now with ANC Conversations & REV)

Former 
 TJ Manotoc (now with North American Bureau Chief)
 Annalisa Burgos 
 Paolo Abrera (now with CNN Philippines)

Final Segments 
 Matters of Fact
 Shop Talk

Former Segments 
 Food Diplomacy

See also
 List of programs shown on the ABS-CBN News Channel

References

External links 
 

ABS-CBN News Channel original programming
ABS-CBN news shows
English-language television shows
2020s Philippine television series
2017 Philippine television series debuts
2020 Philippine television series endings
Breakfast television in the Philippines